Hercules Commando was a light infantry regiment of the South African Army. It formed part of the South African Army Infantry Formation as well as the South African Territorial Reserve.

History

Origin
This unit was initially established as the Pretoria North West Rifle Association in 1923.

Operations

With the UDF
By 1925, the name was changed to the Pretoria Moot Rifle Association.
Rifle Association s were however disbanded with the outbreak of WW2.

By 1948, skietkommandos were established and Hercules Commando was initially based in the Pretoria suburb of Hercules. A total of 490 men were recruited.

With the SADF

Upgraded to Regiment
By 1983 the existing elements of the commando was converted into Regiment Pretorius.

The unit served in the operational areas of South West Africa and the Far Northern Transvaal.

The Regiment continued to wear the infantry Bok up to 1989 when a new badge with a caracals head was introduced.

The Regiment received its National Colours on 31 May 1990.

The Regiment was converted to an urban coin unit, now with Northern Transvaal Command.

The Regiment was moved to a new HQ at Voortrekkerhoogte in May 1992.

With the SANDF

Amalgamation into Tshwane Regiment

In December 2002, Regiment Pretorius with other structures in the Greater Pretoria area was amalgamated into the new Tshwane Regiment.

Leadership

Insignia

Dress Insignia

References

See also 
 South African Commando System

Infantry regiments of South Africa
South African Commando Units
Disbanded military units and formations in Pretoria